Millennium Live is a cancelled international television special, which was an unsuccessful attempt to broadcast an international celebration of the beginning of the Year 2000, or the so-called Millennium. Reports claimed that the show was to have involved broadcasters in up to 130 nations. Millennium Live: Humanity's Broadcast was going to compete against the 2000 Today international broadcast that was supported by ABC in the United States, and led by BBC in the UK.

The programme was called off on 28 December 1999 when its organizers, the Millennium Television Network (MTN), announced that it had failed to obtain sufficient financing for the broadcast. MTN reportedly was not paying production and satellite companies for their services prior to the cancellation before MTN shelved their efforts to establish a global broadcast for the following New Year's Eve.

History
The Millennium Television Network (MTN) was formed by Live Aid's American producer Hal Uplinger to prepare and conduct the broadcast. A series of early planning activities among international representatives reportedly occurred in Cannes in October 1998. Millennium Live was planned as a 24- or 25-hour broadcast from 11:00 UTC 31 December 1999.

Pax TV (now known as Ion Television) of the United States had the exclusive rights to broadcast the show which they billed as Pax Millennium Live: A New World's Eve.

Scheduled musical guests included Aerosmith, Bee Gees, Blondie, Chicago, Phil Collins, Destiny's Child, Ricky Martin, 'N Sync, The Pretenders, Sting, Santana and 10,000 Maniacs. Bryan Adams, Simply Red and the Spice Girls were also sought as featured artists.

New Year's Eve celebrations from various worldwide locations were to have been seen on the show.  (Chile), Carmen Electra (US), Ramzi Malouki (France), and Zam Nkosi (South Africa) were also scheduled as a program hosts for the represented nations. The studios of a television special were to have been hosted in Los Angeles on a set contained in a 90-foot geodesic dome at Manhattan Beach in the United States.

The program was cancelled on 28 December 1999 with an announcement that MTN had failed to obtain sufficient financing for the broadcast. MTN reportedly was not paying production and satellite companies for their services prior to the cancellation. Pax aired a series of movies in Millennium Live's place, and MTN never materialised its reported plans to establish a global broadcast for the following New Year's Eve on the real Millennium (2001).

Broadcasters
The following broadcasters were reported as participants in Millennium Live:

 Australia: Nine Network
 Brazil: Rede Bandeirantes
 Canada: MuchMoreMusic
 Chile: Chilevisión
 Estonia: TV1
 France: France 2
 Germany: Sat.1
 Hong Kong: STAR TV, ATV and TVB
 India: Zee TV
 Italy: Rai 1, Rai 2, Rai 3, Italia1, Rete 4, Canale5
 Japan: Vibe TV (now MTV Japan)
 Mexico: Televisa, and TV Azteca
 New Zealand: TV3
 Philippines: Studio 23
 Portugal: SIC
 South Africa: SABC
 South Korea: KBS
 Spain: Telecinco
 Turkey: NTV
 United Kingdom: ITV
 United States: Pax (now Ion Television)
 Venezuela: Venevisión

Note: Italy's RAI was the only broadcaster that moved to the 2000 Today broadcast

See also
 2000 Today – the successful international television special, which was broadcast in 78 countries (including broadcasters from the cancelled Millennium Live TV special)

References

External links
 Everything 2000 - New Year's Eve Broadcast Plans 26 January 1999
 Everything 2000 - Millennium Live Worldwide Broadcast Cancelled 29 December 1999
 Kansas City Star - Y2K: The TV takeover 29 December 2001
 Kansas City Star - Funding glitch shuts down Pax's millennium special (via TV Barn) 30 December 1999
 Millennium Hell - Pax Backs Hacks. Lacks Facts. Backtracks. Sacks Millennium Quacks to the Max
 Egypt2000.com - The Twelve Dreams of the Sun - Jean-Michel Jarre performance

Unaired television shows
International broadcasting
Turn of the third millennium